Psychotridine is an alkaloid found in some species of the genus Psychotria, namely Psychotria colorata, but also Psychotria forsteriana, Psychotria lyciiflora, Psychotria oleoides, and Psychotria beccarioides. Psychotridine has analgesic effects and dose-dependently inhibits dizocilpine binding to cortical membranes in vitro, suggesting that it acts as a non-competitive NMDA receptor antagonist.

See also 
 Hodgkinsine

References 

Alkaloids
NMDA receptor antagonists
Pyrroloindoles